Corinda State High School (CSHS) is a non-selective, co-educational, state secondary school, located in Corinda, Queensland, Australia. The school was established in 1960.

Campus
The school is located on one campus in the western suburbs of Brisbane. The school has extensive outdoor as well as indoor sporting facilities, a performing arts centre and an agricultural farm as part of the "outdoor classroom". The agricultural farm is a unique resource for a large school in close proximity to the city centre of Brisbane and world-class universities.

Student leadership
Corinda State High School encourages leadership towards students. Students have many opportunities to become a student leader which falls under the following categories: Student Executive, School Captains, Sport Captains, Social Captains, Arts Captains and Portfolio Captains. The school captains are all grade 12 students who work with the Principal and Deputy Principal's to promote the school's culture. The Student Executive is a group of year 12 students who work as a team to create a better environment for all students and also participate in all events within the school to help promote the culture of the school. Sports Captains are also grade 12 and 11 students who work together to promote the sporting culture within the school. There are also house captains from each of the sporting houses. The Arts Captains are grade 12 and 11 students who work closely with the Arts Head of Department and Arts Teachers who help promote Corinda's Arts programs and subjects which are combined of: Drama, Music, Visual Art, Practical Art, Dance and Digital Design Studies. Portfolio Captains help promote their elected portfolio within the school community.

On 18 October 2017, a Facebook post by the school announcing students will no longer be permitted to enter the local Coles Supermarket before or after school gained a large amount of media attention. This prompted Channel 9 News to create a news segment on the subject, interviewing students before and after school. The news video went viral, attaining over 120,000 views as of the 22 October 2017.

Academics

Curriculum offered
The school offers a wide selection of authority subjects (Overall Position - O.P. eligible subjects) including:

Accounting
Agriculture 
Ancient History
Biological Science
Business Communication & Technologies
Business Organisation & Management
Chemistry
Dance
Drama
Economics
English
French
Geography
German
Graphics
Health Education
Home Economics
Information Processing & Technology
Japanese
Legal Studies
Mandarin
Mathematics A, B and C
Modern History
Multistrand Science
Music and Music Extension
Physics
Senior Agricultural Science
Senior Physical Education
Spanish
Tourism
Visual Art

As well as this the school also offers a number of authority-registered subjects and Vocational Education and Training (VET).

Extra-curricular
The school offers a wide variety of extra curricular activities including sports, music, arts and tours.

Notable alumni 

Chris Bailey (musician, born 1956), (1973), The Saints (band) 1974
Jacinda Barrett, 1984–85, Hollywood actress and model
Natalie Cook OAM, (1991), Olympian, beach volleyball, 2000 Olympics Gold Medalist
Melissa Howard, (2006), Australian actress, best known for playing Rebecca Ainsworth in Dead Gorgeous
Ed Kuepper, (1973), musician, The Saints (band) 1974–1979, The Laughing Clowns 1979–1984, The Aints, Since 1991, The Apartments
Tevita Kuridrani, rugby player, Wallaby International debut 2013, ACT Brumbies
 Deborah Lovely, (2001), Deborah Acason, weightlifter, Commonwealth Games Gold Medalist Melbourne 2006
 Emeritus Professor William (Bill) Lovegrove AO, (mid 1960s), academic, University of Southern Queensland, awarded Officer of the Order Australia
 Geoffrey Michael William McKellar (around 1966 or 1967), oral and maxillofacial surgeon Westmead Hospital in 1981, Head of the Department in 1994 and Associate Professor at the University of Sydney in 1988
 Shane Richardson, (1973), CEO, South Sydney Rabbitohs, Rugby League Club, appointed 2004 and longest serving NRL CEO. Previously CEO Penrith Panthers 2002-03
Robert Vickers, (1975), bass The Go Betweens, 1983-88; publicist for New York indie label Jetset Records, 1998; Owner PR company, Proxy Media since 2005

References

Educational institutions established in 1960
Public high schools in Brisbane
1960 establishments in Australia
Corinda, Queensland